Sklerolibyon is an extinct genus of megacheiran arthropod, known from the Cambrian aged Chengjiang biota of Yunnan, China. It is a member of the family Jianfengiidae, alongside Jianfengia and Fortiforceps, and possibly also Parapeytoia. The body is greatly elongated, and head shield is heavily sclerotised, with a pair of spines radiating outward from the sides. Alongside the pair of great appendages, there are a pair of stalked eyes and at least two other pairs of limbs on the cephalon. The trunk has 34 segments with corresponding biramous appendages, with typically megacheiran paddle-shaped exopods. The tail is unknown but like Jianfengia probably ended in a telson spine.

References 

Megacheira
Cambrian arthropods
Cambrian animals of Asia
Cambrian Series 2 first appearances
Maotianshan shales fossils
Fossil taxa described in 2020
Prehistoric arthropod genera